USS Henlopen (SP-385) was a minesweeper and tug that served in the United States Navy from January to March 1918.
 
Henlopen was built as a commercial fishing boat of the same name in 1912 by W. G. Abbott at Milford, Delaware. On 12 December 1917, the U.S. Navy acquired her at New York City from her owner, James W. Elwell & Co., of New York City, for use on the section patrol as a minesweeper and tug during World War I. She was commissioned as USS Henlopen (SP-385) on 26 January 1918.

After two months of service, Henlopen was transferred to France at New York City on 27 March 1918 for French Navy use as a minesweeper and tug.

References

NavSource Online: Section Patrol Craft Photo Archive: Henlopen (SP 385)

Minesweepers of the United States Navy
World War I minesweepers of the United States
Auxiliary ships of the United States Navy
World War I auxiliary ships of the United States
Ships built in Milford, Delaware
1912 ships
Ships transferred from the United States Navy to the French Navy